Wild Animals is a 1996 Korean film by Kim Ki-duk.

Wild Animals may also refer to:
 Wild animals or wildlife
 Wild Animals (The Pinker Tones album) (2008)
 Wild Animals (Juliana Hatfield album)
 Wild Animals (Trampled by Turtles album)

See also
 Wild Animal, an album by Vanity
 Wild Animals I Have Known
 Wild Beast (novel), a Chinese novel
 Wild Beasts, an English indie rock band
 Wildlife (disambiguation)